Edwin Samuel Crump CIE (born 6 July 1882, died 5 March 1961) was an English civil engineer specialising in hydraulics.

Early life and education 
Crump was born in Wolverhampton, Staffordshire, England, the youngest child of Charles Crump and Clara Annie Crump (nee Gittoes). His father Charles Crump was Chief Clerk, Northern Division, Great Western Railway Company, prominent football legislator and administrator, and committed Methodist. Edwin Crump was educated as a civil engineer at the Department of Engineering, Imperial College.

Personal life 
Crump married Helen Elizabeth Jefferis in 1913 and had two sons, Anthony Jefferis Crump (born 1914) and Colin Edwin Crump (born 1916).

Career and accomplishments 
Crump joined the Indian Service of Engineers in 1906 and was based in Punjab Province, British India. Here he was engaged in irrigation projects of the Punjab Water Station. During World War I Crump served as an engineer in South Africa. Crump retired from the Indian Service of Engineers in 1937. After returning to England, Crump joined in 1949 the newly established Hydraulics Research Station at Wallingford, Oxfordshire, part of the Hydraulic Research Organisation, Department of Scientific and Industrial Research. In 1952 he was promoted to Senior Scientific Officer, retiring in 1956.

Honors and recognition 
Crump was made Companion of the Indian Empire (CIE) at the King's Birthday Honours of 1936 for his work with the Indian Service of Engineers as Superintending Engineer, Public Works Department (Irrigation Branch), Punjab Province.

Edwin Samuel Crump was the inventor of the Crump weir that is named for him. The Crump weir is a two dimensional triangular weir with a horizontal crest in the transverse direction and a triangular crest shape in the stream-wise direction. Crump weirs are used as measuring structures in open channels.

Publications 
Crump published a number of seminal papers in the field of hydraulics, including methods to accurately measure stream flow by means of the Crump weir, design of steeply graded pipelines, and vortex-siphon spillways.

References 

1882 births
1961 deaths
English civil engineers
Companions of the Order of the Indian Empire
Imperial College Faculty of Engineering
Hydraulic engineers